Anadoluhisarı, known historically as Güzelce Hisar ("the Beauteous Castle") is a medieval Ottoman fortress located in Istanbul, Turkey on the Anatolian (Asian) side of the Bosporus. The complex is the oldest surviving Turkish architectural structure built in Istanbul, and further gives its name to the neighborhood around it in the city's Beykoz district.

History
Anadoluhisarı was built between 1393 and 1394 on the commission of the Ottoman Sultan Bayezid I, as part of his preparations for a siege on the then-Byzantine city of Constantinople.

The site is bound by Göksu creek to the south, and was previously home to the ruins of a Roman temple dedicated to Uranus.

Constantinople was blockaded from 1394 on, but Bayezid's campaign was first interrupted by the Crusade of Nicopolis, and then ended with his defeat at the Battle of Ankara. An 11-year civil war followed, which ended with the ascent of Mehmed I to the throne. His grandson, Sultan Mehmed II reinforced the fortress with a two-meter-thick wall and three additional watchtowers, and added further extensions, including a warehouse and living quarters. As part of his plans to launch a renewed military campaign to conquer Constantinople, Mehmed II further built a sister structure to Anadoluhisarı across the Bosphorus called Rumelihisarı, and the two fortresses worked in tandem in 1453 to throttle all maritime traffic along the Bosphorus, thus helping the Ottomans achieve their goal of making the city of Constantinople (later renamed Istanbul) their new imperial capital.

After the Ottoman conquest of the city, Anadoluhisarı served as a customs house and military prison, and after several centuries, fell into disrepair.

After the fall of the Ottomans and the 1923 establishment of the Republic of Turkey, the newly created Turkish Ministry of Culture tended to and ultimately restored the site in 1991–1993. Today, Anadoluhisarı lends a picturesque appearance to its corner of the Bosphorus alongside the timber yalı homes that define the neighborhood, and functions as a historical site, although it is not open to the public. The latest restoration was conducted by Istanbul Metropolitan Municipality which started in 2021.

Gallery

See also
 Rumelihisarı
 Yedikule Fortress
 Conquest of Constantinople
 Ottoman architecture

Notes
 Architectural Museum (in Turkish)
 Principals of Ottoman fort architecture (in Turkish)

References

External links

Pictures of the fortress

Buildings and structures completed in 1394
Archaeological sites in the Marmara Region
Bosphorus
Castles in Istanbul Province
Forts in Turkey
Museums in Istanbul
Ottoman fortifications
Beykoz